Filipovci is a village in the municipality of Kratovo, North Macedonia.

Demographics
According to the 2002 census, the village had a total of 112 inhabitants, all of which are ethnic Macedonians.

References

Villages in Kratovo Municipality